The AH-IV was a Czechoslovak-designed export armored fighting vehicle, classed as either a tankette or light tank, used  by Romania during World War II, but having also been acquired by neutral Sweden and Iran. Modified AH-IV versions were built under license by Romania (R-1) and Sweden (Strv m/37). The Romanian vehicles saw action on the Eastern Front from Operation Barbarossa to the Vienna offensive. Twenty vehicles were sold after the war to Ethiopia, who used them until the 1980s.

Description 
Českomoravská Kolben-Daněk was determined not to repeat the problems of its earlier Tančík vz. 33 tankette and gave the gunner a turret for better observation and all-around fields of fire for its new AH-IV tankette. The driver sat on the right side using an observation port protected by bulletproof glass and an armored shutter. To his right was a small vision slit. Also to his right, in all models except the Swedish Strv m/37, was a light Zbrojovka Brno ZB vz. 26 or vz. 30 machine gun that was usually locked in place and fired using a Bowden cable. The gunner sat on the left and manned a small turret fitted with a ZB vz. 35 or ZB vz. 37 heavy machine gun in a ball mount. Most of the machine gun's barrel protruded from the mount and was protected by an armored trough. He had a large vision port to the right of the machine gun mount in the turret and a small vision slit on the left side of the superstructure. 3700 rounds were carried for the two machine guns. No radio was fitted.

The , water-cooled, six-cylinder Praga engine produced  at 2,500 rpm. It sat in the rear of the fighting compartment and drove the transmission via a drive shaft that ran forward between the driver and commander to the gearbox. Cooling was designed to draw air in through the commander's and driver's hatches. This had the advantage of rapidly dispersing gun combustion gases when firing, but several disadvantages. The constant draft generated by the engine greatly affected the crew during cold weather, an engine fire would force the crew to evacuate and the engine noise and heat increased crew fatigue. The semi-automatic Praga-Wilson transmission had five forward gears and one reverse gear to drive the forward-mounted drive sprocket. The suspension was a smaller version of that used in the Panzerkampfwagen 38(t). It consisted of four large road wheels per side, each pair mounted on a wheel carrier and sprung by leaf springs. There were two wheel carriers per side. The idler wheel was at the rear and one return roller was fitted. It had a ground pressure of only 0.5 kg/cm2.

Variants

Iran: RH (AH-IV-P)
Iran was the first customer for the AH-IV and ordered fifty plus a prototype in 1935 for delivery the following year. Deliveries began in August 1936 with the last batch arriving in Iran in May 1937, although the armament was shipped separately and wasn't installed until November 1937. The Iranians were well pleased with their vehicles and planned to order between 100 and 300 additional AH-IVs, but the outbreak of World War II prevented any follow-through. Their tankettes were the smallest of the series at only  and differed only slightly in size from the Romanian R-1 tankettes that followed it on the production lines. It used the ZB vz. 26 and 35 machine guns.

Romania: R-1 (AH-IV-R)

The Romanians signed a contract for 36 AH-IV-R, as they were designated by ČKD, on 14 August 1936, including one prototype to be delivered in two months and the entire order in seven months. These deadlines were unable to be met as the Romanians demanded many changes, which all had to be made on the production line because ČKD had initiated production of the entire order before the prototype was accepted. The first ten tankettes off the production line were sent to Romania in October 1937 to participate in the autumn maneuvers when they made a favorable impression before being returned to the factory. The production run was completed the next month, but the Romanians refused to accept them as they didn't conform to the specifications. The required modifications took until April 1938 to perform, but another evaluation was required under summer conditions and they weren't formally accepted until August 1938. Nicolae Malaxa bought a license to produce the R-1 as the AH-IV-R was known in Romanian service, in September 1938, but irregularities and disputes over payment delayed the transfer of the production drawings until October 1939. His factory built one prototype, mostly from R-1 spare parts, but never began production.

Sweden: Strv m/37 (AH-IV-Sv)

Sweden ordered forty-eight tankettes in 1937 as the Stridsvagn m/37 (Strv m/37) after a successful demonstration during winter conditions in the Krkonoše Mountains. Its turret mounted two Swedish  Ksp m/36 strv machine guns and sported a small observation cupola on its top. It carried a radio and 3960 rounds for its machine guns. The last components were shipped in November 1938.

Ethiopia: AH-IV-Hb
Ethiopia ordered twenty AH-IV-Hb tankettes on 24 June 1948. In form these reverted to the driver's machine gun and single machine gun in the turret, but were of welded construction rather than riveted. It used the ZB vz. 26 and vz. 37 machine guns, for which it carried 2800 rounds.

Operational history

Iran
The AH-IVs were split between the 1st and 2nd Infantry Divisions in service. Nothing more is known of their service or when they were withdrawn.

Romania

The R-1s were assigned to the cavalry brigades, two platoons of two or three tankettes apiece. All eighteen belonging to the Cavalry Corps were grouped into the ad hoc "Korne Mechanized Detachment" during the opening stages of Operation Barbarossa, but all were out of commission by 1 October. Twenty-nine of the original thirty-five were allocated to the six cavalry divisions (redesignated from brigades on 25 March 1942) that successfully participated in the German 1942 summer offensive, codenamed Case Blue. The four R-1s belonging to the 1st Cavalry Division's 1st Mechanized Squadron had to be set on fire as no fuel was available for them when the division was encircled outside of Stalingrad in November 1942 as part of the Soviet Operation Uranus counter-offensive. The 5th and 8th Cavalry Divisions had lost at least five R-1s during the same time trying to solidify the crumbling Axis defenses after the Soviet breakthroughs. Both divisions supported the Germans as they attempted to relieve the Stalingrad Pocket in Operation Winter Storm, but were shattered when the Soviets counter-attacked the unsuccessful relief effort in late December 1942. Two other cavalry divisions remained in the Kuban bridgehead after the German withdrawal from the Caucasus, but their two remaining serviceable R-1s were withdrawn back to Romania during the spring of 1943 as obsolete. On 30 August 1943 only thirteen R-1s were available, all assigned to the Cavalry Training Center, although this increased by one on inventories dated 25 March and 19 July 1944. Nothing is known of any action involving R-1s during 1944, but eleven reinforced the 2nd Armored Regiment in Czechoslovakia when it reached the front on 26 March 1945. By 24 April the regiment only had one R-1 available, but none were reported as available after that date.

Sweden
The Strv m/37s initially served with the 1st Armored Battalion until the armored brigades began to be formed in 1943–44. Thereafter they served with the infantry regiments I 2, I 9, I 10 and P 1G Armored Company on Gotland. The tankettes remained in service on Gotland up to 1953.

Ethiopia
All twenty arrived in Djibouti on 9 May 1950 after which they were railed to Addis Ababa. They were used until the 1980s when they participated in the fighting against Somalia.

See also
 R-1 tank, article covering the Romanian variant in detail

Notes

References

External links
 photos of a Strv m/37 under restoration
 some photos of Iranian vehicles
 R-1 in Romanian service
 photo series on Romanian armor
 photo series on Swedish armor

Light tanks of Czechoslovakia
World War II tankettes
Military vehicles introduced in the 1930s
Tankettes of the interwar period